The Mitsubishi HSR (Highly Sophisticated-transport Research) is a range of concept cars exhibited by Mitsubishi Motors through the late 1980s and 1990s. There were six distinct iterations of the vehicle released biannually to coincide with the Tokyo Motor Show, with each model after the original identified by a Roman numeral suffixed to the name. The meaning of the acronym varied over the years. The first iteration meant Hi-speed Running Research, the second Hi-Sophisticated Research, and the third Human Science Research.

Models
 HSR (1987) — The first vehicle was a showcase for Mitsubishi's integrated electronic systems offering automatic control of drive train, suspension, steering, brakes, and driving position according to driving conditions or weather.
 HSR-II (1989) — The second generation had a heavy emphasis on active aerodynamics, with a series of movable fins and spoilers offering a drag factor which varied from 0.20 to 0.40 depending on setup. Much of the technology found its way to the Mitsubishi HSX, the precursor to the company's GTO sports car. It is also featured in the games Gran Turismo 4, Gran Turismo 5 and Gran Turismo 6.
 HSR-III (1991) — The third concept car to bear the HSR name was powered by the  6A10 1.6-litre V6, the world's smallest mass-produced V6. Its design themes were "Human Scale Technology" and "Small is beautiful." It continued the active aerodynamics theme of the HSR-II, but with the addition of flexible skin on the rear spoiler, dubbed an "elastic aerotail." Shifting from the overtly sporting and powerful earlier HSRs, the HSR-III also focused on cleanliness and recyclability - with the body parts all marked for ease of recycling.
 HSR-IV (1993) — A  modulated displacement version of the 1.6-litre V6 powered the fourth prototype, a four-wheel-drive sports car featuring an all-wheel anti-lock braking system.
 HSR-V (1995) — The fifth generation, a targa topped sports car with a folding hardtop roof, featured the debut of Mitsubishi's gasoline direct injection (GDI) technology in its ICDIGE engine.
 HSR-VI (1997) — Fitted with a 2.4-litre version of the GDI engine, the sixth HSR concept featured four-wheel steering, active yaw control, traction control and an automated driving system.

References

Hsr
Vehicles with four-wheel steering
Coupés